Mäeltküla is a village in Viljandi Parish, Viljandi County, in southern Estonia. As of 2011 Census, the settlement's population was 86.

Ekseko farm, the biggest pig farm in the Baltic states with 37,500 pigs, is located in Mäeltküla It is the main producer of Rakvere Lihakombinaat's meat.

References

Villages in Viljandi County